Hallowell's tree frog (Hyla hallowellii) is a species of frog in the  family Hylidae.

Etymology
The specific name, hallowellii, is in honor of American herpetologist Edward Hallowell.

Distribution and habitat
Hyla hallowelii is endemic to Japan.

The natural habitats of H. halowellii are subtropical or tropical moist lowland forests, subtropical or tropical moist shrubland, subtropical or tropical seasonally wet or flooded lowland grassland, swamps, freshwater marshes, intermittent freshwater marshes, plantations, heavily degraded former forests, ponds, irrigated land, canals, and ditches.

References

Further reading
Thompson JC (1912). "Prodrome of Descriptions of New Species of Reptilia and Batrachia from the Far East". Herpetological Notices (2): 1–4. (Hyla hallowellii, new species, pp. 2–3).

Hyla
Endemic amphibians of Japan
Amphibians described in 1912
Taxonomy articles created by Polbot